Vaimastvere is a village in Jõgeva Parish, Jõgeva County in eastern Estonia.

Details 
Playwright Hugo Raudsepp (1883–1952) and basketball player Aleksander Illi (1912–2000) were born in Vaimastvere.

References

 

Villages in Jõgeva County
Kreis Dorpat